Ivan Koledić (born 27 September 1989) is a Croatian football forward, currently playing for NK Borinci Jarmina.

Club career
He joined second tier-outfit Gorica from Cibalia in September 2013.

References

External links

1989 births
Living people
Sportspeople from Vinkovci
Association football forwards
Croatian footballers
HNK Cibalia players
HNK Vukovar '91 players
HNK Gorica players
Croatian Football League players
First Football League (Croatia) players